The Guadalcanal bow-fingered gecko (Cyrtodactylus biordinis) is a species of gecko endemic to Guadalcanal in the Solomon Islands.

References

Cyrtodactylus
Reptiles described in 1980